Darwin Township is located along the Wabash River in eastern Clark County, Illinois, USA.  As of the 2010 census, its population was 342 and it contained 164 housing units.
The township was named for the village of Darwin, which was named for the English scientist, Charles Darwin.

Geography

Unincorporated towns
 Darwin
 Ernst
 Snyder

Cemeteries
The township contains these three cemeteries: Bubeck, Darwin and Hall.

Major highways
  Illinois Route 1

Rivers
 Wabash River

Demographics

School districts
 Marshall Community Unit School District 2c

Political districts
 Illinois' 15th congressional district
 State House District 109
 State Senate District 55

References

 Perrin, William Henry, ed.. History of Crawford and Clark Counties, Illinois Chicago, Illinois. O. L. Baskin & Co. (1883).

 United States Census Bureau 2007 TIGER/Line Shapefiles
 United States National Atlas

External links
 City-Data.com
 Illinois State Archives

Townships in Clark County, Illinois
Townships in Illinois